The Sotho people, also known as the Basuto or Basotho, are a Bantu nation native to southern Africa. Basothos have inhabited the region of Lesotho, South Africa since around the fifth century CE. They have split into different clans over time, as result of mfecane and colonialism. There are 4 Basotho groupings in Southern Africa viz Eastern basotho, South Sotho, West Sotho "Batswana" and North Sotho.  The Southern Basothos found themselves divided by colonialism into half, one group in South Africa and the other in Lesotho. The British and the Boers,  [Dutch descendants] colonized parts of the basotho land through scramble for Africa. This led to the formation of Lesotho in the 1869 Convention of Aliwal North following the conflict over land between Moshoeshoe and the Dutch descendants. 

The Southern Basotho of Lesotho's identity emerged from the creation of Lesotho after the Boers defeated Moshoeshoe I, in the Third Basotho War in 1868 which led the British to give him a small piece of land, the current Lesotho when he asked for their protection against the Boers and he lost the rest of his land, the British gave it to the Boers who put a border around that violently stolen land, dividing Southern Basothos and they turned their side into their country they named it Orange Free State . Most Southern Basotho today live in Lesotho or in the Free State which later became a province of South Africa after the Boers lost the war against the British, the British a annexed Free State and turned it into a province. Some of the Southern Basothos who were not part of Moshoeshoe's kingdom when he united some of those Southern Basotho clans who make the modern Lesotho and Free State are living in Vaal and some are found in parts of KwaZulu-Natal and Eastern Cape

History

Early history

Bantu-speaking peoples had settled in what is now South Africa by about 500 CE. Separation from the BaTswana its assumed to have taken place by the 14th century. Some basotho people split from the nguni while others got assimilated into building the nguni nation. The basotho nation are a mixture of Bantu clans.By at least the 17CE, a series of Basotho kingdoms covered the southern portion of the plateau (Free State Province and parts of Gauteng). Basotho society was highly decentralized, and organized on the basis of kraals, or extended clans, each of which was ruled by a chief. Chiefdoms were united into loose confederations.

19th century

In the 1820s, refugees from the Zulu expansion under Shaka came into contact with the Basotho people residing on the highveld. In 1823, pressure caused one group of Basotho, the Kololo, to migrate north. They moved past the Okavango Swamp and across the Zambezi into Barotseland, which is now part of Zambia. In 1845, the Kololo conquered Barotseland.

At about the same time, the Boers began to encroach upon Basotho territory.

At the time of these developments, Moshoeshoe I gained control of the Basotho kingdoms of the southern highveld. Universally praised as a skilled diplomat and strategist, he moulded the disparate refugee groups escaping the Difaqane into a cohesive nation.

In 1822, Moshoeshoe established the capital at Butha-Buthe, an easily defensible mountain in the northern Drakensberg mountain range, thus laying the foundations of the eventual Kingdom of Lesotho. His capital was later moved to Thaba Bosiu.

To deal with the encroaching  groups, Moshoeshoe encouraged French missionary activity in his kingdom. Missionaries sent by the Paris Evangelical Missionary Society provided the King with foreign affairs counsel and helped to facilitate the purchase of modern weapons.

Aside from acting as state ministers, missionaries (primarily Casalis and Arbousset) played a vital role in delineating Sesotho orthography and printing Sesotho language materials between 1837 and 1855. The first Sesotho translation of the Bible appeared in 1878.

In 1868, after losing the western lowlands to the Boers during the Free State–Basotho Wars, Moshoeshoe successfully appealed to Queen Victoria to proclaim Basutoland (modern Lesotho) a protectorate of Britain. Accordingly, the British administration was established in Maseru, the site of Lesotho's current capital. Local chieftains retained power over internal affairs, while Britain was responsible for foreign affairs and the defense of the protectorate.

In 1869, the British sponsored a process to demarcate the borders of Basutoland. While many clans had territory within Basutoland, large numbers of Sesotho speakers resided in areas allocated to the Orange Free State, the sovereign  republic that bordered the Basotho kingdom. King Moshoeshoe died two years in 1870, after the end of war, and was buried at the summit of Thaba Bosiu.

20th century

Britain's protection ensured that repeated attempts by the Orange Free State, and later the Republic of South Africa, to absorb part or all of Basutoland were unsuccessful. In 1966, Basutoland gained its independence from Britain, becoming the Kingdom of Lesotho.

Sesotho is widely spoken throughout the sub-continent due to internal migration. To enter the cash economy, Basotho men often migrated to large cities in South Africa to find employment in the mining industry. Migrant workers from the Free State and Lesotho thus helped to spread Sesotho to the urban areas of South Africa. It is generally agreed that migrant work harmed the family life of most Sesotho speakers because adults (primarily men) were required to leave their families behind in impoverished communities while they were employed in distant cities.

Attempts by the apartheid government to force Sesotho speakers to relocate to designated homelands had little effect on their settlement patterns. Large numbers of workers continued to leave the traditional areas of Black settlement. Women gravitated towards employment as agricultural or domestic workers while men typically found employment in the mining sector.

In terms of religion, the central role that Christian missionaries played in helping Moshoeshoe I secure his kingdom helped to ensure widespread Basotho conversion to Christianity. Today, the bulk of Sesotho speakers practice a form of Christianity that blends elements of traditional Christian dogma with local, pre-Western beliefs. Modimo ("God") is viewed as a supreme being who cannot be approached by mortals. Ancestors are seen as intercessors between Modimo and the living, and their favor must be cultivated through worship and reverence. Officially, the majority of Lesotho's population is Catholic.

The Basotho's heartland is the Free State province in South Africa and neighboring Lesotho. Both of these largely rural areas have widespread poverty and underdevelopment. Many Sesotho speakers live in conditions of economic hardship, but people with access to land and steady employment may enjoy a higher standard of living. Landowners often participate in subsistence or small-scale commercial farming ventures. However, overgrazing and land mismanagement are growing problems.

Demographics
The allure of urban areas has not diminished, and internal migration continues today for many black people born in Lesotho and other Basotho heartlands. Generally, employment patterns among the Basotho follow the same patterns as broader South African society. Historical factors cause unemployment among the Basotho and other Black South Africans to remain high.

Percent of Sesotho speakers across South Africa:

 Gauteng Province: 13.1%
 Atteridgeville: 12.3%
 City of Johannesburg Metropolitan Municipality: 9.6%
 Soweto: 15.5%
 Ekurhuleni Metropolitan Municipality: 10.02%
 Katlehong: 22.4%
 Sedibeng District Municipality: 46.7%
 West Rand District Municipality: 10.8%
 Midvaal Local Municipality: 27.9%
 Free State Province: 64.2%
 Bloemfontein: 33.4%

Language

The language of the Basotho is referred to as Sesotho, less commonly known as Sesotho sa borwa. Some texts may refer to Sesotho as "Southern Sotho" to differentiate it from Northern Sotho, also called Sepedi.

Sesotho is the first language of 1.5 million people in Lesotho, or 85% of the population. It is one of the two official languages in Lesotho, the other being English. Lesotho enjoys one of Africa's highest literacy rates, with 59% of the adult population being literate, chiefly in Sesotho.

Sesotho is one of the eleven official languages of South Africa. According to the South African National Census of 2011, almost 4 million people speak Sesotho as a first language, including 62% of Free State inhabitants. Approximately 13.1% of the residents of Gauteng speak Sesotho as a first language. In the North West Province, 5% of the population speak Sesotho as a first language, with a concentration of speakers in the Maboloka region. Three percent of Mpumalanga's people speak Sesotho as a first language, with many speakers living in the Standerton area. Two percent of the residents of the Eastern Cape speak Sesotho as a first language, though they are located mostly in the northern part of the province.

Aside from Lesotho and South Africa, 60,000 people speak Silozi (a close relative of Sesotho) in Zambia. Additionally, a few Sesotho speakers reside in Botswana, Eswatini and the Caprivi Strip of Namibia. No official statistics on second language usage are available, but one conservative estimate of the number of people who speak Sesotho as a second (or later) language is 5 million.

Sesotho is used in a range of educational settings both as a subject of study and as a medium of instruction. It is used in its spoken and written forms in all spheres of education, from preschool to doctoral studies. However, the number of technical materials (e.g. in the fields of commerce, information technology, law, science, and math) in the language is still relatively small.

Sesotho has developed a sizable media presence since the end of apartheid. Lesedi FM is a 24-hour Sesotho radio station run by the South African Broadcasting Corporation (SABC), broadcasting solely in Sesotho. There are other regional radio stations throughout Lesotho and the Free State. Half-hour Sesotho news bulletins are broadcast daily on the SABC free-to-air channel SABC 2. Independent TV broadcaster eTV also features a daily half-hour Sesotho bulletin. Both SABC and the eTV group produce a range of programs that feature some Sesotho dialogue.

In Lesotho, the Lesotho National Broadcasting Service broadcasts to South Africa via satellite pay-TV provider, DStv.

Most newspapers in Lesotho are written in Sesotho or both Sesotho and English. There are no fully fledged South African newspapers in Sesotho except for regional newsletters in Qwaqwa, Fouriesburg, Ficksburg, and possibly other Free State towns.

Currently, the mainstream South African magazine Bonaincludes Sesotho content. Since the codification of Sesotho orthography, literary works have been produced in Sesotho. Notable Sesotho-language literature includes Thomas Mofolo's epic Chaka, which has been translated into several languages including English and German.

Clothing
The Basotho have a unique traditional attire. This includes the mokorotlo, a conical hat with a decorated knob at the top that is worn differently for men and women. The Basotho blanket is often worn over the shoulders or the waist and protects the wearer against the cold. Although many Sotho people wear westernized clothing, often traditional garments are worn over them.

Basotho herders
Many Basotho who live in rural areas wear clothing that suits their lifestyles. For instance, boys who herd cattle in the rural Free State and Lesotho wear the Basotho blanket and large rain boots (gumboots) as protection from the wet mountain terrain. Herd boys also often wear woolen balaclavas or caps year-round to protect their faces from cold temperatures and dusty winds.

Basotho women
Basotho women usually wear skirts and long dresses in bright colors and patterns, as well as the traditional blankets around the waist. On special occasions like  wedding celebrations, they wear the Seshoeshoe, a traditional Basotho dress. The local traditional dresses are made using colored cloth and ribbon accents bordering each layer. Sotho women often purchase this material and have it designed in a style similar to West and East African dresses.

Women often wrap a long print cloth or a small blanket around their waist, either as a skirt or a second garment over it. This is commonly known as a wrap, and it can be used to carry infants on their backs.

Special clothing items
Special clothing is worn for special events like initiation rites and traditional healing ceremonies.

For a Lebollo la basadi, or a girl's initiation ceremony, girls wear a beaded waist wrap called a thethana that covers the waist, particularly the crotch area and part of the buttocks. They also wear grey blankets and goatskin skirts. These garments are worn by young girls and women, particularly virgins.

For a Lebollo la banna, or a boy's initiation ceremony, boys wear a loincloth called a tshea as well as colorful blankets. These traditional outfits are often combined with more modern items like sunglasses.

Traditional Sotho healers wear the bandolier which consists of strips and strings made of leather, sinew or beads that form a cross on the chest. The bandolier often has pouches of potions attached to it for specific rituals or physical/spiritual protection. It is believed that the San people adopted this bandolier attire for healers during times when the Basotho and the San traded and developed ties through trade, marriage and friendship. The San people's use of the bandolier can be seen in their rock paintings that date to the 1700s.

Notable Sotho people

Politics

 Moshoeshoe I – Founder of the Basotho nation
 Moshoeshoe II – King of Lesotho
 Letsie III – Reigning King of the Basotho
Queen 'Masenate Mohato Seeiso – Queen Consort of Lesotho
 Pakalitha Mosisili – Former Prime Minister of Lesotho
 Epainette Mbeki – South African anti-apartheid activist and mother of former president Thabo Mbeki of South Africa
 Tom Thabane – Former Prime Minister of Lesotho
 Ntsu Mokhehle – Former Prime Minister of Lesotho
 Leabua Jonathan – Former Prime Minister of Lesotho
 Mosiuoa Lekota – South African anti-apartheid activist, Member of Parliament. And the current President of the COPE
 Hlaudi Motsoeneng – South African radio personality and broadcasting executive

Entertainment
 Steve Kekana – South African musician
 Joshua Pulumo Mohapeloa – music composer
 Lira – South African singer
 Yvonne Chaka Chaka – South African singer
 Maleh – Lesotho-born singer
 Michael Mosoeu Moerane – choral music composer
 Mpho Koaho – Canadian-born actor of Sotho ancestry
 Terry Pheto – South African actress
 Sankomota – Lesotho jazz band
 Thebe Magugu – South African fashion designer
 Kamo Mphela – South African dancer
 Fana Mokoena – South African actor and Member of Parliament for Economic Freedom Fighters
 Tshepo "Howza" Mosese – South African actor and musician
 Kabelo Mabalane – South African musician and one third of the Kwaito group Tkzee

Sports
 Khotso Mokoena – Athlete (Long jump)
 Steve Lekoelea – Former football player for Orlando Pirates
 Aaron Mokoena – Former football player for Jomo Cosmos, Blackburn Rovers, and Portsmouth FC
 Thabo Mooki – Former football player for Kaizer Chiefs and Bafana Bafana
 Abia Nale – Former football player for Kaizer Chiefs
 Lebohang Mokoena – Football player for Moroka Swallows
 Jacob Lekgetho
 Lehlohonolo Seema – Retired footballer, Coach of Chippa United
 Kamohelo Mokotjo – Football player
 Lebohang Maboe – Football player for Mamelodi Sundowns

See also
 Sotho–Tswana peoples
 Sotho-Tswana languages
 Tswana people
 Pedi people
 Barotseland
 Lozi people
 Liphofung Historical Site
 Sekhukhuneland
 Sotho calendar
 Battle of Berea

References